John Shelton (born 23 December 1933) is  a former Australian rules footballer who played with Fitzroy in the Victorian Football League (VFL).

Notes

External links 
		

Living people
1933 births
Australian rules footballers from Victoria (Australia)
Fitzroy Football Club players